Great George Street is a street of the Causeway Bay area, on Hong Kong Island, Hong Kong.

Name
The street was named after the street of the same name in Westminster, London, which is named after King George II of Great Britain.

Light pollution
In October 2008, an environmental organisation, Friends of the Earth, Hong Kong, released a result of online election about the "light pollution" emitted from the commercial building, Windsor House, in this street. They found the intensity of the light is 10,000 lux, equivalent to the brightness of daylight.

References

External links
 

Causeway Bay
Roads on Hong Kong Island
Wan Chai District